Rainer Schüttler was the defending champion, but lost in the first round this year.

Robin Söderling won the tournament, beating Xavier Malisse 6–2, 3–6, 6–4 in the final.

Seeds

Draw

Finals

Top half

Bottom half

References

 Main Draw
 Qualifying Draw

Singles
2004 ATP Tour